The Bishop of West Malaysia is an Anglican prelate who oversees the Diocese of West Malaysia in the Church of the Province of South East Asia. The current bishop is the 5th Bishop of the Diocese since its creation in 1970. His seat is St. Mary's Cathedral, Kuala Lumpur.

History

Anglicanism came to the Malay Peninsula following the establishment of the British East India Company's administered settlement on Penang island in 1786. The local magistrate, George Caunter, was appointed a Lay Clerk/Acting Chaplain to provide spiritual ministry to the settlers. Under his ministry the first entry into the Church Register was made in 1799. The Diocese of Calcutta provided episcopal supervision for the chaplaincy work on Penang island and the first Anglican Church building, the Church of St. George the Martyr, was built and consecrated in 1819.

In 1867, the administration of the Straits Settlements passed from the hands of the East India Company to the British Crown and in 1869, Anglican churches in the Straits Settlements was placed under the episcopal supervision of the Bishop of Labuan and her Dependencies with the diocese expanded and renamed as the Diocese of Labuan, Sarawak and Singapore.

In 1909, the Straits Settlements was separated to form its own diocese, the Diocese of Singapore. With the Independence of Malaya in 1957 and by 1960, the diocese was renamed the Diocese of Singapore and Malaya. After the Independence of Singapore in 1965, Singapore was separated from the diocese and in 1970, the Diocese of West Malaysia was established with the former Bishop of Sabah, Roland Koh, being appointed as the first Bishop of West Malaysia.

In 2015, a decision was made by the Diocesan Synod to further divide the diocese into three separate dioceses and in 2016, two area dioceses were created, the Area Diocese of the Northern Peninsula and the Area Diocese of the Southern Peninsula, in preparation and two suffragan bishops were licensed to oversee the area dioceses. Provisional approval of the Provincial Synod for the creation of the new dioceses by 2020 has since been obtained.

List of Bishops

References

External links 

Diocese of West Malaysia 

Anglican Communion church bodies
Christian organizations established in 1970
Anglicanism in Malaysia
1970 establishments in Malaysia